Noel Thomas Lemass (14 February 1929 – 13 April 1976) was an Irish Fianna Fáil politician who served as Parliamentary Secretary to the Minister for Finance from 1969 to 1973. He served as a Teachta Dála (TD) for Dublin South-West from 1956 to 1976.

Early life
Born in Dublin in 1929, Lemass was the son of Seán Lemass, a Fianna Fáil TD, and Kathleen Lemass (née Hughes). He was named after his uncle, a victim of the Irish Civil War in the early 1920s. Lemass was educated at Catholic University School, Leeson Street in Dublin and later at Newbridge College in County Kildare. Against his father's wishes, rather than attend university, he undertook business training and later becoming an executive member and branch secretary of the Irish Commercial Traveller's Association.

Political career
Lemass followed his father into politics in 1955, when he was elected to Dublin City Council. He was elected to Dáil Éireann in a by-election in Dublin South-West the following year. The by-election was a loss for Fine Gael, who was in government at the time, and whose TD had held the seat for a number of years.

He was active in a number of political councils and other groupings. From 1966 to 1968, he was a member of the Consultative Assembly of the Council of Europe. He was also a member of the Irish-British Parliamentary Group and the Irish-French Parliamentary Group.

In 1969, Lemass was appointed as Parliamentary Secretary to the Minister for Finance, with responsibility for the Board of Works. In his first year at the Department he served under his brother-in-law, Charles Haughey, and later under George Colley.

When Fianna Fáil lost office in 1973, Lemass was named on the front branch as spokesperson for physical planning and the environment. He held that position until January 1975 when he was dropped from the front bench.

Personal life
Lemass married Eileen Delaney in 1950. The couple had four children. Lemass's wife became involved in politics herself when she became a member of Dublin Corporation. She also entered the Dáil following the death of her husband.

See also
Families in the Oireachtas

References

 

 

 

1929 births
1976 deaths
Children of Taoisigh
Fianna Fáil TDs
Lemass family
Local councillors in Dublin (city)
Members of the 15th Dáil
Members of the 16th Dáil
Members of the 17th Dáil
Members of the 18th Dáil
Members of the 19th Dáil
Members of the 20th Dáil
Parliamentary Secretaries of the 19th Dáil
Spouses of Irish politicians
People educated at Newbridge College